This is a sortable list of first-person shooter engines.

Early first-person shooter graphics engines

Early 1990s: wireframes to 2.5D worlds and textures

Mid 1990s: 3D models, beginnings of hardware acceleration

Late 1990s: 32-bit color, GPUs become standard

Early 2000s: increasing detail, outdoor environments, rag-doll physics

Mid 2000s: lighting and pixel shaders, physics

Late 2000s to 2010s: the approach to photorealism

2020s: 8K and high frame rates

Specialized engines/engine middle-ware

Some features may be integrated into engines. For instance for trees and foliage a special "engine" is available, SpeedTree, that does just that (or could be integrated into general engines). The Euphoria character's 3D animating engine can be used independently but is integrated in the Rockstar Advanced Game Engine and the game Grand Theft Auto IV.

See also
 List of free first-person shooters
 List of game engines
 First-person shooter engine

References

 
Technology-related lists